Joanna is a 2013 Polish documentary film by Aneta Kopacz about Joanna Salyga, a young woman with cancer with only three months to live, and her efforts to make the most of her time with her husband and young son. Kopacz learned of Salyga's story through her blog Chustka. Salyga's readers sponsored a crowdfunding campaign to produce this film. Joanna was nominated for the Academy Award for Best Documentary (Short Subject) at the 87th Academy Awards, along with another Polish film in the same category, Our Curse.

Awards and nominations

References

External links
 

2013 films
2013 short documentary films
Polish short documentary films
Documentary films about cancer
Documentary films about death
Documentary films about women
Crowdfunded films
Films scored by Jan A. P. Kaczmarek